The Ministry of Land, Infrastructure and Transport (MOLIT) is a cabinet-level division of the government of South Korea.

The ministry was originally the Ministry of Construction and Transportation. The Ministry of Maritime Affairs and Fisheries was merged into the construction and transportation agency.

Work 
The main tasks are establishing and coordinating national territory policy and basic laws related to national territory, preserving and developing national territory and water resources, construction of urban, road and housing, construction of coastal, river, and land reclamation, and land reclamation.

Offices

Agencies
 Aviation and Railway Accident Investigation Board
 Korea Office of Civil Aviation
 Korean Maritime Safety Tribunal

References

External links

 Ministry of Land, Infrastructure and Transport
 Ministry of Land, Infrastructure and Transport

Links to pages of predecessor agencies
 Ministry of Land, Transport and Maritime Affairs (Archive) (2008-2013)
 Ministry of Land, Transport and Maritime Affairs (Archive) (2008-2013) 
 Ministry of Construction and Transportation (Archive) (2003-2008)
 Ministry of Construction and Transportation (Archive) (2000-2004)
 Ministry of Construction and Transportation (Archive) (1997-1998)
 Ministry of Construction and Transportation (Archive) 

Land, Infrastructure and Transport
Transport organizations based in South Korea
Geography of South Korea
South Korea
South Korea
South Korea
Housing ministries
South Korea, Land, Infrastructure and Transport